Trifluoromethanesulfonic anhydride, also known as triflic anhydride, is the chemical compound with the formula (CF3SO2)2O. It is the acid anhydride derived from triflic acid. This compound is a strong electrophile, useful for introducing the triflyl group, CF3SO2. Abbreviated Tf2O, triflic anhydride is the acid anhydride of the superacid triflic acid, CF3SO2OH.

Preparation and uses
Triflic anhydride is prepared by dehydration of triflic acid using P4O10.

Triflic anhydride is useful for converting ketones into enol triflates.

In a representative application, is used to convert an imine into a NTf group. It will convert phenols into a triflic ester, which enables cleavage of the C-O bond.

Assay
The typical impurity in triflic anhydride is triflic acid, which is also a colorless liquid. Samples of triflic anhydride can be assayed by 19F NMR spectroscopy: −72.6 ppm vs. −77.3 for TfOH (std CFCl3).

Safety
It is an aggressive electrophile and readily hydrolyzes to the strong acid triflic acid. It is very harmful to skin and eyes.

See also
 Methanesulfonic anhydride

References

Triflyl compounds
Acid anhydrides
Reagents for organic chemistry